Spalford is a hamlet and civil parish in the Newark and Sherwood district of Nottinghamshire, England. Spalford was listed in the Domesday Book (1086) as 'Spaldesforde'.

The hamlet is located between South Clifton and Weecar near the county boundary with Lincolnshire, north of Newark-on-Trent. Spalford was a township in the parish of North Clifton, it became a separate parish in 1866.

According to the 2001 census it had a population of 85.

To the west of the parish is the River Trent, and to the south is the Local nature reserve and Site of Special Scientific Interest known as Spalford Warren. The reserve habitat is made up of blown sand heathland, which is rare in Nottinghamshire.

Spalford Floodbank
In 1795 during the largest known flood on the Trent, the floodbank which is situated between Spalford and the river was breached. Floodwaters from the breach spread out across the low-lying land, even reaching the River Witham and flooding Lincoln. Some 20,000 acres were flooded for a period of over three weeks. A description of the breach was given as follows:

The flood bank was subsequently strengthened and repaired, following further Trent floods in 1824 and 1852.

References

Hamlets in Nottinghamshire
Civil parishes in Nottinghamshire
Newark and Sherwood